Trichocirca is a monotypic moth genus in the family Choreutidae described by Edward Meyrick in 1920. Its only species, Trichocirca tyrota, described in the same publication, is known from Kenya.

Taxonomy
Trichocirca was included in the Yponomeutidae by Thomas Bainbrigge Fletcher in 1929. It was transferred to the Choreutidae on the advice of the late Jorma Kyrki of Finland.

References

Endemic moths of Kenya
Choreutidae
Moths of Africa
Monotypic moth genera